The Household Division forms a part of the British Army's London District, and is made up of five regiments of foot guards and two Household Cavalry regiments. The division is responsible for performing public duties and state ceremonies in London and Windsor. Such functions include the State Opening of Parliament, Trooping the Colour, and mounting the King's Guard. 

From 1950 to 1968, the Household Division was known as the Household Brigade.

Composition

In the United Kingdom, the Household Division consists of seven regiments, giving rise to the division's motto of Septem juncta in uno (Latin for 'seven joined in one'). The Household Division is made up of the Household Cavalry, which includes the Life Guards and the Blues and Royals; as well as five regiments of foot guards, the Grenadier Guards, the Coldstream Guards, the Scots Guards, the Irish Guards, and the Welsh Guards The seven regiments that form the Household Division in the United Kingdom are the seniormost cavalry and infantry units of the regular army.

In 2004, the Minister of Defence announced that the foot guards would gain a reserve (or Territorial Army) battalion, the London Regiment, which was redesignated as the London Guards in 2022, but as yet the division's motto has not been changed to reflect the eighth regiment.

The foot guards provide two battalions and incremental companies at any one time tasked for public duties together with the Household Cavalry Mounted Regiment.

History
In medieval Western Europe, the ablest warriors were pressed into service as the personal bodyguards to the monarch and other members of the royal or imperial household; as a result, Household troops are commonly referred to as Guards. From this origin developed the practice of designating a country's finest military units as forming Household or Guards regiments.

Members of the Household Divisions would accompany the monarch to protect him when he ventured into the public. Hence, as kingdoms grew larger and more politically complex, the Household Divisions naturally became part of the public spectacle of the state. Their uniforms, weapons and even personal attributes such as height were selected to engender awe on ceremonial occasions. The Household Divisions thus developed a tradition of providing a theatrical ceremonial accompaniment to important national events.

The prestige of serving directly with the monarch created an incentive for the Household Divisions to become dominated by members of the upper classes, irrespective of their actual skills as soldiers. From this development comes the association of Household Divisions with wealth, snobbery, and discrimination, which persisted until the middle of the 20th century.

Members of the remaining Household Divisions continued to enjoy a certain social prestige within the armed forces and the state at large. They do, however, continue to fulfil their ceremonial roles at state occasions and to uphold the more enduring traditions of military service.

Postings
The Household Division was once responsible for mounting the guard to several institutions in London. In 1819, the Household Division maintained ten separate guard mountings for 89 sentry posts. These include the Armoury Guard, the British Museum Guard, the Kensington Palace Guard, the King's Guard, the Magazine Guard, the Military Asylum Guard, the Savoy Prison Guard, the Tylt Guards, and the York Hospital Guard. In addition, the Household Division also provided night guards for the Bank of England, Covent Garden Opera House, and Drury Lane. 

However, at the end of the 19th century, the Household Division's commitment to most of these postings, besides the King's Guard, ceased. The cessation of most postings was the result of their building's demolition, although the British Museum Guard was assumed by the Metropolitan Police.

Command

They are under the command of the Major-General Commanding the Household Division, who is also the general officer commanding London District. The divisional command is made up of the major general, his chief of staff (usually a colonel), the brigade major (usually a lieutenant colonel), the staff captain, the staff officer ceremonial, the superintending clerk, and the garrison sergeant major. In addition, both the Household Cavalry and the foot guards have their own chains of command, as do the individual regiments.

The connection with the sovereign remains important ceremonially, and the Household Division provides ceremonial for the Crown. The sovereign is colonel-in-chief of all the constituent regiments of the division. One of the five foot guards regiments is selected each year to troop their colour before the Sovereign at Trooping the Colour annually in June. This ceremony includes march pasts in slow and quick time and is attended by the Household Troops. Orders for the Household Division are conveyed to the major-general via officers who are part of the Royal Household: the Field Officer in Brigade Waiting (for the foot guards) and the Silver Stick in Waiting (for the Household Cavalry).

Similar units in the Commonwealth
Several other military units of the Commonwealth of Nations perform a similar function to the British Army's Household Division.

Australia

In 2000, the Australian Defence Force (ADF) established the Australia's Federation Guard, creating the first ceremonial unit in the force's history for the commemoration of the centenary of Australian federation. The unit performs several ceremonial functions on the Australian government's behalf, like forming a guard of honour. However, the unit is not associated with a head of state. The unit draws its members from all three service branches of the ADF.

Canada

In Canada, there are three guard units that are associated with the viceregal representative of the Canadian monarch, the governor general. They include Canadian Army Reserve's seniormost armoured regiment, the Governor General's Horse Guards, and its two regiments of foot guards, the Governor General's Foot Guards and the Canadian Grenadier Guards; the regiments of foot guards also being the seniormost infantry regiments of the reserves. 

One of the main tasks of the two regiments of foot guards is the provision of sentries for public duties and ceremonial functions in support of the governor general. These duties include mounting the guard at Rideau Hall, the residence of the governor general and monarch in Ottawa; and the Trooping of the Colour at Parliament Hill on Victoria Day. The units also supplement and support the ad hoc Ceremonial Guard public duties unit, although the composition of the Ceremonial Guard is open to all members of the Canadian Armed Forces. 

The Governor General's Horse Guards and the two Canadian regiments of foot guards have regimental alliances with their counterparts in the British Army's Household Division. The Governor General's Horse Guards have an alliance with the Blues and Royals, the Governor General's Foot Guards have an alliance with the Coldstream Guards, and the Canadian Grenadier Guards have an alliance with the British Grenadier Guards.

History in Canada

In the 1950s, the Canadian Grenadier Guards and the Governor General's Horse Guards were informally known as "His Majesty's Brigade of Canadian Guards". From 1953 to 1970, the four Regular Force battalions of the Canadian Guards were the units charged with performing public duties in Ottawa. In 1970, the Canadian Guards were reduced to nil strength and moved to the Supplementary Order of Battle. Public duties formerly assigned to the Canadian Guards were assigned to the most senior infantry regiments of the Army Reserve, the Canadian Grenadier Guards and the Governor General's Horse Guards.

In early 2019, as a result of discussions on new military berets for units, the foot guards adopted khaki berets as a way to highlight their status as foot guards of Royal Canadian Infantry Corps, following the British colour precedent for their own foot guards in the 1970s.

India

Although India is a republic, its history as a dominion within the British Empire has left it with a host of institutions of quasi-imperial forms. As a result, the Indian Armed Forces retains several guard units that are associated with the president of India and perform ceremonial duties on the government's behalf. These guard units include a regiment each representing the infantry and cavalry of the Indian Army. These two regiments recruit nationally with officers and other ranks coming from every corner of India regardless of caste, religion and language.

The President's Bodyguard was established in 1773 as the Governor's Troop of Moghuls and is the only cavalry guard unit in the Indian Army. The unit was renamed in 1784, 1859, 1944, and 1946, before it adopted its present name in 1950.

The Brigade of the Guards was once the most senior line infantry regiment before it was changed into a mechanised infantry unit. However, the unit is still recognised as the Indian Army's most senior infantry regiment and is recognized as first in the order of precedence. The brigade was formally established in 1949 and includes the three oldest infantry battalions in the Indian Army.

Malaysia

The Malaysian Army's 12th Malaysian Infantry Brigade (Household and Guards Brigade) is made up of two infantry battalions each from the Royal Malay Regiment and the Royal Ranger Regiment and the Malaysian Royal Armoured Corps Mounted Ceremonial Squadron. The Royal Malay Regiment serves as the regiment of foot guards of the Yang di-Pertuan Agong and the Raja Permasuri Agong (King and Queen of Malaysia), together with Royal Armoured Corps Mounted Ceremonial Squadron, which serves as the ceremonial royal cavalry escort unit. They perform public duties and mount the guard at Istana Negara, Kuala Lumpur. The 1st Battalion, Royal Ranger Regiment, the seniormost battalion of the regiment, also serves in public duties roles.

Given the large size of the Royal Malaysian Regiment as the senior regiment of the Malaysian infantry, the ceremonial responsibility of mounting the infantry guard is the permanent duty of the unit's 1st Battalion. While both the 1st Battalion RMR and 1st Battalion RRR recruit only Malays (with the latter also having in their ranks soldiers from the Sarawak and Sabah ethnic minorities), the Mounted Ceremonial Squadron is a multiracial formation, with Malay, Indian, Chinese and Orang Asli servicemen.

See also
 Royal guard

References

External links

 
 Official website of the Household Cavalry

Regiments of the British Army
 
Military units and formations of the Canadian Army
Infantry regiments of the Indian Army from 1947